Kingerby is a village and former civil parish in the West Lindsey district of Lincolnshire, England.

In 1936 the parish became part of Osgodby parish.

The parish church is dedicated to Saint Peter and is a Grade I listed building cared for by The Churches Conservation Trust; it became redundant in 1981. 
It dates from the early 11th century and is built of Ironstone. 
There are three monuments in the church to 13th- and 14th-century knights.  There are also several marble tablets to the Young family
of Kingerby Hall. To the north and east of the church are scheduled  earthworks of an ecclesiastical enclosure in which Elsham Priory was located.

Kingerby Hall, or Manor, is a Grade II listed building dating from 1812. It is situated on the scheduled site of a motte and bailey castle and a later moated manor house. The castle was built sometime prior to 1216, in which year it burnt down. In the 12th and 13th centuries a village grew up around the castle, but in the 17th century the village population declined.

References

External links

Villages in Lincolnshire
West Lindsey District
Former civil parishes in Lincolnshire